"Hi! Hi! Hi!" is a 1986 song performed by German pop singer Sandra. It was written by Michael Cretu, Hubert Kemmler and Klaus Hirschburger, and produced by Cretu and Armand Volker.

The song was released as the second single from Sandra's second solo album, Mirrors, in autumn 1986. It was commercially successful, reaching the Top 10 in Germany, and the Top 20 in Austria, France and Switzerland. It also peaked on the airplay chart in Austria at No. 11. and in Germany at No. 12.
 
The music video for the song was directed by DoRo (Rudi Dolezal and Hannes Rossacher). The clip was released on Sandra's VHS video compilations Ten on One (The Singles) and 18 Greatest Hits, released in 1987 and 1992, respectively, as well as the 2003 DVD The Complete History.

A new remix of the song was included on Sandra's 2006 retrospective Reflections.

Formats and track listings
 7" single
A. "Hi! Hi! Hi!" – 3:31
B. "You'll Be Mine" – 4:33

 12" single
A. "Hi! Hi! Hi!" (Extended Version) – 6:12
B1. "You'll Be Mine" – 4:33
B2. "Hi! Hi! Hi!" – 3:31

Charts

References

External links
 "Hi! Hi! Hi!" at Discogs
 The official Sandra YouTube channel

1986 singles
1986 songs
Sandra (singer) songs
Song recordings produced by Michael Cretu
Songs written by Hubert Kemmler
Songs written by Klaus Hirschburger
Songs written by Michael Cretu
Virgin Records singles